John Hou (born 25 September 1968) is a Papua New Guinean sprinter. He competed in the men's 100 metres at the 1988 Summer Olympics.

References

External links

1968 births
Living people
Athletes (track and field) at the 1988 Summer Olympics
Papua New Guinean male sprinters
Olympic athletes of Papua New Guinea
Commonwealth Games competitors for Papua New Guinea
Athletes (track and field) at the 1990 Commonwealth Games
World Athletics Championships athletes for Papua New Guinea
Place of birth missing (living people)